Doppelgänger is the debut studio album by English alternative rock band Curve. It was released on 9 March 1992 in the United Kingdom by Anxious Records, and on the following day in the United States by Anxious and Charisma Records.

A continuation of the musical idiom established by the group on its three earlier EPs, Doppelgänger combines elements of dance music and alternative rock with the reverb-laden and distortion-heavy stylings of shoegaze.

Critical reception

J. D. Considine of Musician said: "Curve's thick, psychedelic throb crosses the electrobeat aggression of Front 242 with the blurred guitar drone of Lush, an approach that allows the band the advantages of both styles without becoming openly in thrall to either. And it sounds just fine, in part because of the care with which Dean Garcia tends his soundscapes, and mostly because of the way Toni Halliday's cool, throaty vocals snake melody through the thick-swirling grooves. A singularly entrancing album."

In Q, David Cavanagh wrote:

In its end-of-year round-up issue, Q stated that "Doppelgänger delighted with its thrashy guitar sounds, bone-rattling drum tattoos and cool, poised vocal performances."

Legacy
Q featured Doppelgänger in a 1999 list of the best "gothic" albums: "A thundering, subtly melodic debut drowned out the critics and, though it was all over two years later, the multimillion-selling Garbage had certainly learned something." In 2013, the record was included in PopMatters list of 10 essential shoegaze albums other than My Bloody Valentine's Loveless. In 2016, Pitchfork ranked Doppelgänger at number 40 on its list of the 50 best shoegaze albums of all time; in an accompanying essay, Stephen Thomas Erlewine wrote:

Track listing

Personnel
Credits are adapted from the album's liner notes.

Curve
 Dean Garcia – bass, guitar, keyboards, drum programming
 Toni Halliday – vocals

Additional musicians
 Alex Mitchell – guitar
 Steve Monti – drums
 Alan Moulder – guitar
 Debbie Smith – guitar

Production
 Darren Allison – mixing (assistant)
 Denis Blackham – mastering
 Curve – production, engineering
 Flood – production, engineering
 Alan Moulder – mixing
 Charles "Giles" Steel – engineering (assistant)
 Ingo Vauk – engineering

Design
 Flat Earth – design, photography

Charts

References

External links
 
 

1992 debut albums
Curve (band) albums
Albums produced by Flood (producer)
Charisma Records albums